is a Japanese footballer who plays for Azul Claro Numazu from 2023.

Career
Munechika begin first youth career with Hosei University from 2011 until 2014 after graduation at University.

Munechika begin first professional career with J3 club, YSCC Yokohama from 2015. He leave from club in 2022 after eight seasons at Yokohama.

In 2023, Munechika joined to J3 club, Azul Claro Numazu.

Career statistics
.

References

External links

Profile at YSCC Yokohama

1992 births
Living people
Hosei University alumni
Association football people from Hiroshima Prefecture
Japanese footballers
J3 League players
YSCC Yokohama players
Azul Claro Numazu players
Association football defenders